Hiraizumi is a town in Iwate Prefecture, Japan.

Hiraizumi may also refer to:

Hiraizumi Station, train station in Hiraizumi, Iwate, Japan
29249 Hiraizumi, main-belt minor planet

People with the surname
Gina Hiraizumi (born 1980), American actress and singer
, Japanese historian and Shinto priest
, Japanese actor

Japanese-language surnames